DYTE-TV, channel 32 (analog) and channel 18 (digital), is a commercial television station owned and operated by TV5 Network Inc. Its transmitter is located at PLDT Compound, Galo St., Bacolod.

History
July 8, 1993 - Associated Broadcasting Company opened its TV station ABC Channel 32 Bacolod, with its studio and transmitter tower in H.O. Building in B.S. Aquino Drive, Bacolod.
December 9, 1994 - ABC TV stations acquired a new franchise to operate under Republic Act 7831 signed by President Fidel V. Ramos. In the same year, the station went on nationwide satellite broadcasting. In a phenomenal growth, ABC Bacolod earned its reputation as "The Fastest Growing Network" under new network executive Tina Monzon-Palma who served as Chief Operating Officer.
August 8, 2008 - The station aired a countdown to its re-launch for much of the next day until 19:00 PHT, when the network officially re-launched under its new name of TV5.
2011 - TV5 Bacolod was relaunched with an authorized power of 30,000-watt stereo TV transmitter. The station's signals are perceivable throughout the Negros Island, and can also reach in several parts of Panay, especially Iloilo.
2014 - TV5 Bacolod moved its studio from H.O. Building in B.S. Aquino Drive to its new transmitter facilities at the PLDT Compound in Galo Street.
February 17, 2018 - as the recent changes within the network and in celebration of its 10th anniversary, TV5 Bacolod was relaunched as The 5 Network with a new logo and station ID entitled Get It on 5 whereas the TV on the northeastern quadrant of the logo has been dropped, making it more flexible for the other divisions to use it as part of their own identity.
January 13, 2019 - following AksyonTV's reformat as 5 Plus, 5 Bacolod introduced a variation of the current numerical 5 logo.
August 15, 2020 - 5 Bacolod reverted to its former name, TV5 (while retaining the variation of its current numerical logo that was introduced in January 2019), as the network announced its partnership with sister company, Cignal TV.
August 15, 2021 - TV5 Bacolod started its digital test broadcasts on UHF Channel 18.

Digital television

Digital channels

UHF Channel 18 (497.143 MHz)

Rebroadcast

Areas of coverage

Primary areas  
 Bacolod
 Negros Occidental

Secondary areas 
 Portion of Iloilo

See also
 TV5
 List of TV5 Stations
 Radyo5 102.3 News FM Bacolod

Television stations in Bacolod
TV5 (Philippine TV network) stations
Television channels and stations established in 1993
Digital television stations in the Philippines